Bathybates fasciatus is a species of fish in the family Cichlidae. It is endemic to Lake Tanganyika where it forms schools and feeds mainly on clupeids.

References
.

fasciatus
Taxa named by George Albert Boulenger
Fish described in 1901
Taxonomy articles created by Polbot